Calhoun County High School is a secondary school in Edison, Georgia, United States.

History
In late 1994, former Calhoun County High School teacher Corkin Cherubini made national headlines when, as district superintendent, he ended district practices the Department of Education's Office of Civil Rights found to be racially biased, including tracking and segregated cheerleading squads.

Extracurricular activities
The school's sports teams, known as the Calhoun County Cougars, compete in GHSA Class A Region 1, Sub-Region A. Teams are fielded in baseball, basketball, cheerleading, football, softball, and track.

References

Public high schools in Georgia (U.S. state)
Schools in Calhoun County, Georgia